During the 2006–07 English football season, Millwall competed in Football League One.

Season summary

Final league table

Results
Millwall's score comes first

Legend

Football League One

FA Cup

League Cup

Players

First-team squad
Squad at end of season

Left club during season

Reserve squad

Notes

References

Millwall F.C. seasons
Millwall F.C.